Laura Wandel is a Belgian film director and screenwriter. 

She made her feature-length debut in 2021 with Playground, a drama film following the life of a seven-year-old girl dealing with the children's and adult's worlds. Playground premiered at the 2021 Cannes Film Festival, where it competed for the Caméra d'Or award for best first feature film, winning the FIPRESCI Prize. It received the André Cavens Award for Best Film given by the Belgian Film Critics Association (UCC) and was selected as the Belgian entry for the Best International Feature Film at the 94th Academy Awards.

At the 11th Magritte Awards, Playground was nominated for ten awards and won seven, including Best First Feature Film and Best Director for Wandel.

References

External links

1984 births
Living people
21st-century Belgian writers
21st-century Belgian women writers
Belgian film directors
Belgian women film directors
Belgian screenwriters
Magritte Award winners
Writers from Brussels
Belgian women screenwriters